Saincaize is a railway station in Saincaize-Meauce, Bourgogne-Franche-Comté, France. The station opened on 15 November 1847 and is located on the Moret-Lyon railway and Vierzon-Saincaize railway. The station is served by Intercités (long distance) and TER (local) services operated by SNCF.

There is a freight yard at the station.

Train services

The station is served by regional trains towards Moulins, Nevers, Lyon and Clermont-Ferrand.
regional service (TER Auvergne-Rhône-Alpes) Nevers - Moulins - Saint-Germain-des-Fossés - Vichy - Clermont-Ferrand
regional service (TER Bourgogne-Franche-Comté) Nevers - Moulins - Paray-le-Monial - Lyon

References

Railway stations in Nièvre
Railway stations in France opened in 1847